In enzymology, a cholestenone 5alpha-reductase is an enzyme that catalyzes the chemical reaction

5alpha-cholestan-3-one + NADP+  cholest-4-en-3-one + NADPH + H+

Thus, the two substrates of this enzyme are 5alpha-cholestan-3-one and NADP+, whereas its 3 products are cholest-4-en-3-one, NADPH, and H+.

This enzyme belongs to the family of oxidoreductases, specifically those acting on the CH-CH group of donor with NAD+ or NADP+ as acceptor.  The systematic name of this enzyme class is 3-oxo-5alpha-steroid:NADP+ Delta4-oxidoreductase. Other names in common use include testosterone Delta4-5alpha-reductase, steroid 5alpha-reductase, 3-oxosteroid Delta4-dehydrogenase, 5alpha-reductase, steroid 5alpha-hydrogenase, 3-oxosteroid 5alpha-reductase, testosterone Delta4-hydrogenase, 4-ene-3-oxosteroid 5alpha-reductase, reduced nicotinamide adenine dinucleotide, phosphate:Delta4-3-ketosteroid 5alpha-oxidoreductase, 4-ene-5alpha-reductase, Delta4-3-ketosteroid 5alpha-oxidoreductase, cholest-4-en-3-one 5alpha-reductase, and testosterone 5alpha-reductase.

References

 

EC 1.3.1
NADPH-dependent enzymes
Enzymes of unknown structure